An economic migrant is someone who emigrates from one region to another, including crossing international borders, seeking an improved standard of living, because the conditions or job opportunities in the migrant's own region are insufficient. The United Nations uses the term migrant worker. 

Although the term economic migrant may be confused with the term refugee, economic migrants leave their regions primarily due to harsh economic conditions, rather than fear of persecution on the basis of race, religion, nationality, political opinion, or membership of a particular social group. Economic migrants are generally not eligible for asylum, unless the economic conditions they face are severe enough to have caused generalised violence, or seriously disturbed the public order.

Legality 
Many countries restrict people from entering their borders to work, unless they have been granted a visa that specifically allows them to work in the country. Migrants who seek paid employment after entering without authorization to work may be subject to deportation.

Advantages and disadvantages
With economic migration on a large scale, the majority of migrants are often of working age, defined by the OECD as 15-64 years of age. In such cases, migration can cause economic strain in the countries they leave behind – as working-age people exit the region, the elderly and aging population remains but with less support. 

However, the mass migration of working-age people can also release pressure on the region's current job market and resources. Migrants also transfer wealth back to their source regions: the World Bank estimates that remittances totaled US$420 billion in 2009, of which $317 billion went to developing countries.

For host regions, the influx of large numbers of working-age migrants is a source of cheap labour. In some cases, economic migrants are highly skilled and looking for specialized jobs not available in their home regions. The inflow of migrants can also increase cultural diversity.

The energy transition to clean energy technologies, mainly solar, wind, and geothermal, should improve economies in the Global South and moderate the number of economic migrants.  Successful energy transitions should also reduce the severity and number of failed states, which usually cause several types of refugee crises.

Labour market
Over the past ten years, migrants accounted for 47% of the increase in the work force in the United States, and for over 70% of the increase in Europe, as reported by the OECD in 2012. 

Migrants fill important niches in the labor market, and contribute significantly to labor market flexibility, especially in Europe. Recent studies from the OECD report that immigrants are playing a crucial role in the labor market: in the U.S., immigrants made up 22% of entries in the fastest growing occupations and 15% in Europe (healthcare, STEM, etc.). 

Immigrants are also highly represented in the slowest growing occupations, making up approximately 28% of new entries in the U.S. and 24% in Europe. In the United States, these occupations are primarily in production and other industries that domestic workers would consider unattractive; in the absence of demand for these occupations, immigrant workers fill these sectors. 

In OECD countries, the inflow of migrants accounts for less than 0.5%+/- change in GDP. Exceptions to this are Switzerland and Luxembourg, which have approximated a 2% net benefit in GDP due to migrants.

Many developing economies largely depend on remittances sent from abroad. For example, the total remittance to GDP ratio has been estimated to be 12% in Armenia. After its independence from the Soviet Union a considerable amount of emigration from Armenia happened between 1992-1994. By the official government statistics around 780,000 people emigrated from Armenia during 1991-1998 due to war and the economic conditions. Also, due to the increased trends in immigration the country receives most of its remittances, about 64%, from the process of voluntary migration of workers to Russia, followed by the U.S. accounting to 14% of the total remittances received from abroad.

See also 
 2015 European migrant crisis
 Anchor baby
 Asylum shopping
 Chain migration
 Economic inequality
 Economic results of migration
 Human capital flight
 Poverty
 Refugee
 Remittance

References

Immigration
Illegal immigration
Criticisms of welfare